State Route 256 (SR 256) is a  east–west state highway in the central portion of the U.S. state of Ohio. The western terminus of SR 256 is at a T-intersection with U.S. Route 40 (US 40) in Reynoldsburg.

Route description
SR 256 runs through parts of Franklin, Fairfield and Perry Counties.  No portion of SR 256 is included within the National Highway System (NHS).  The NHS is a system of highways deemed most important for the nation's economy, mobility and defense.

History
The current route of SR 256 between Reynoldsburg and Baltimore was commissioned as SR 204, in 1923. In 1927, SR 256 was commissioned on that section of SR 204. SR 256 was extended east to an intersection with SR 13, in 1937.

Major intersections

References

External links

256
Transportation in Franklin County, Ohio
Transportation in Fairfield County, Ohio
Transportation in Perry County, Ohio